Dammapeta is a mandal in Bhadradri Kothagudem district, Telangana.

Geography 
It has an average elevation of 206 metres (679 ft).

References

Mandals in Bhadradri Kothagudem district